Compaction may refer to:

 Soil compaction, for mechanically induced compaction near the ground surface
 Compaction of ceramic powders
 Compaction (geology), part of the process of lithification involving mechanical dewatering of a sediment by progressive loading under several km of geomaterial
 Waste compaction, related to garbage
 Cold compaction, powder compaction at low temperatures
 Data compaction, related to computers
 Curve-fitting compaction
 Compactor, a device that performs compaction
 Compaction a cellular differentiation process in the early embryo

See also 
 Compact (disambiguation)
 Compactification (disambiguation)
 Impaction (disambiguation)